Samson Kpenosen (born 4 February 1992) is a Nigerian footballer who plays as a forward for Vietnamese club Dong Thap FC.

Transfers
This players contract was extended to another season in 2016.

Club career
Temporarily the top scorer in the 2015 V.League 1 after the sixth round, Samson got his number one brace in a 3-0 success to Dong Thap FC.

Unable to retain his place in Dong Thap FC  since they filled their foreign player slots with new transfers, the club was predisposed to send him on loan.

References

External links
 

Expatriate footballers in Vietnam
Nigerian expatriate sportspeople in Vietnam
Nigerian footballers
Nigerian expatriate footballers
Dong Thap FC players
Association football forwards
Sportspeople from Warri
Living people
1992 births
V.League 1 players